The Thomas A. Mathis Bridge and J. Stanley Tunney Bridge are a pair of bridges that span  Barnegat Bay in Ocean County, New Jersey, connecting Route 37 in Toms River with Pelican Island and communities along the Jersey Shore on the Barnegat Peninsula. The bridges pass through Toms River and a small piece of Berkeley Township, before ending at Route 35 in Seaside Heights.

The Thomas A. Mathis Bridge was completed in 1950 to replace a narrow wooden bridge that had served as the only connection between the mainland and the shore.  It is a bascule bridge that allows ship traffic to pass under the bridge when it is raised.

The J. Stanley Tunney Bridge was completed in 1972 to carry westbound traffic, while the Mathis bridge was dedicated for vehicles traveling eastbound.  The Tunney Bridge is a high level girder bridge that was designed to allow tall ships to pass under it without requiring a bridge opening. Although both bridges have three lanes, those on the Tunney Bridge are wider. Because Route 37 is one of a few links to the barrier island beaches, the bridge and the entire highway are routinely jammed with both local and tourist traffic throughout the summer months.

References

External links 
Article on the safety of the spans following Hurricane Sandy
An enlarged view of road jurisdiction on NJ 35 and NJ 37 at the eastern ends of the Mathis / Tunney Bridges

Seaside Heights, New Jersey
Toms River, New Jersey
Bridges in Ocean County, New Jersey
Bridges completed in 1950
Bridges completed in 1972
Beam bridges
Road bridges in New Jersey
1950 establishments in New Jersey
1972 establishments in New Jersey
Bascule bridges in the United States